Stipe Lapić (born 22 January 1983, Sinj, Croatia) is a Croatian football player who last played for China League One side Chongqing F.C.

Club career
He played at HNK Hajduk Split and PSV Eindhoven's under-19 team. His first senior team was NK Dinamo Zagreb. From this, he played several team in some countries. He also capped Croatia national under-21 football team.

Club career statistics

Honors

Zimbru Chisinau
Moldovan National Division Runner-up (2) : 2005–06, 2006–07
Moldavian Cup Winner (1) : 2006–07

References

External links
 Moldova league performance
 Russia league performance 
 

1983 births
Living people
People from Sinj
Association football defenders
Croatian footballers
Croatia under-21 international footballers
GNK Dinamo Zagreb players
FC Kuban Krasnodar players
ASKÖ Pasching players
FC Zimbru Chișinău players
HNK Šibenik players
NK Slaven Belupo players
Gangwon FC players
NK Zagreb players
Yanbian Funde F.C. players
Chongqing F.C. players
Austrian Football Bundesliga players
Moldovan Super Liga players
Croatian Football League players
K League 1 players
China League One players
Croatian expatriate footballers
Expatriate footballers in Russia
Croatian expatriate sportspeople in Russia
Expatriate footballers in Austria
Croatian expatriate sportspeople in Austria
Expatriate footballers in Moldova
Croatian expatriate sportspeople in Moldova
Expatriate footballers in South Korea
Croatian expatriate sportspeople in South Korea
Expatriate footballers in China
Croatian expatriate sportspeople in China